Events in 1939 in animation.

Films released

Events

January
 January 28: Tex Avery's Hamateur Night premieres, produced by Warner Bros. Cartoons.

February
 February 18: Hamilton Luske's Mickey Mouse cartoon Mickey's Surprise Party premieres, produced by Walt Disney Animation Studios.
 February 23: 11th Academy Awards: The Walt Disney Company's Ferdinand the Bull, directed by Dick Rickard, wins the Academy Award for Best Animated Short.
February 25: Milt Gross' Count Screwloose cartoon Jitterbug Follies premieres, produced by MGM.

March
 March 11: Tex Avery's A Day at the Zoo premieres, produced by Warner Bros. Cartoons .
 March 17: The Walt Disney Company releases Goofy and Wilbur, the first solo Goofy cartoon, directed by Dick Huemer.
 March 25: Chuck Jones' Prest-O Change-O premieres.

April
 April 7: The Ugly Duckling, directed by Jack Cutting and Clyde Geronimi, produced by Walt Disney Animation Studios, premieres.
 April 22: Chuck Jones' Daffy Duck and the Dinosaur premieres, produced by Warner Bros. Cartoons, starring Daffy Duck.

May
 May 20: Chuck Jones' Naughty but Mice premieres, produced by Warner Bros. Cartoons, which marks the debut of Sniffles the Mouse.

June
 June 10: Harman & Ising's The Bear That Couldn't Sleep is first released, produced by MGM which marks the debut of Barney Bear.

July
 July 1: Chuck Jones' Porky Pig cartoon Old Glory premieres, produced by Warner Bros. Cartoons which stands out for being a serious and educational propaganda cartoon about the Pledge of Allegiance.
 July 7: The final Betty Boop cartoon Rhythm on the Reservation, produced by the Fleischer Brothers,  premieres.
 July 21: Clyde Geronimi's Mickey Mouse cartoon The Pointer premieres, produced by the Walt Disney Animation Studios. In the cartoon Mickey and Pluto go hunting and encounter a bear.

September
 September 1: 
 Jack King's Donald Duck cartoon The Autograph Hound premieres, produced by the Walt Disney Animation Studios.
 BBC Television Service broadcasts the Mickey Mouse cartoon Mickey's Gala Premier, produced by the Walt Disney Animation Studios. Afterwards it ceases all broadcasting because of the outbreak of World War II. An urban legend about this final broadcast claims that due to the sudden outbreak of the war the BBC cut the cartoon short and when BBC-TV resumed after the conflict, it was picked up at the very point it had been interrupted. Despite this widespread belief, the cartoon was shown in its entirety and then followed by tuning signals. On 7 June 1946, the day BBC television broadcasts resumed after the war, Mickey's Gala Premier was shown again.

October
 October 7: Chuck Jones' The Little Lion Hunter premieres in which Inki and the Mynah Bird make their debuts.
 October 9: Walter Lantz's Life Begins for Andy Panda premieres, which marks the debut of Andy Panda.

December
 December 9: Hugh Harman's Peace on Earth premieres, produced by MGM which will become a classic.
 December 22: The Fleischer Studios release Gulliver's Travels, the second American feature-length animated film.

Specific date unknown
 In Antwerp Ray Goossens, Henri Winkeler, Jules Luyckx and Edmond Roex establish their own animation studio, AFIM (Antwerpse Filmmaatschappij). It will exist until 1944.
 Kenzō Masaoka's Benkei tai Ushiwaka premieres.

Films released

 July 1 - The Golden Key (Soviet Union)
 December 22 - Gulliver's Travels (United States)

Births

January
 January 10: Harrie Geelen, Dutch illustrator, film director and animator (Toonder Studios).

February
 February 2: Jackie Burroughs, English-born Canadian actress (voice of the Spirit in The Care Bears Movie, Katherine in Heavy Metal, Morag in Star Wars: Ewoks, Frau Rottenmeier in Heidi), (d. 2010).
 February 7: Vladimir Tarasov, Russian animator and animation director (Soyuzmultfilm).
 February 15: Taichirō Hirokawa, Japanese voice actor, (d. 2008). 
 February 27: David Mitton, English television and film director and producer, model maker and special effects technician (Thomas & Friends), (d. 2008).

March
 March 5:
 Camillo Teti, Italian production manager, film producer and director (Titanic: The Legend Goes On, Yo-Rhad, un amico dallo spazio).
 Samantha Eggar, English-American actress (voice of Hera in the Hercules franchise, Queen Guinevere in The Legend of Prince Valiant, Whale in Metalocalypse).

April
 April 10: Shinji Mizushima, Japanese manga artist (Dokaben), (d. 2022).
 April 13: Paul Sorvino, American actor (voice of Alphonse Perrier du von Scheck in Hey Arnold!: The Movie, Variecom CEO in the Duckman episode "How to Suck in Business Without Really Trying"), (d. 2022).
 April 23: 
 Lee Majors, American actor (voice of General Abernathy in G.I. Joe: Renegades, Jeff Tracy in Thunderbirds Are Go, Steve from Ausin in the Wapos Bay episode "Guardians", Babar and David Faustino's Agent in the Robot Chicken episode "Love, Maurice", himself in the Family Guy episode "Running Mates").
 Patrick Williams, American composer, arranger and conductor (The Simpsons), (d. 2018).
 April 28: Michiyo Yasuda, Japanese animator (Toei Animation, A Production, Nippon Animation, Topcraft, Studio Ghibli), (d. 2016).

May
 May 22: Paul Winfield, American actor (voice of Mr. Smith in The Wish That Changed Christmas, Jeffrey Robbins in Gargoyles, Mr. Ruhle in The Magic School Bus, Omar Mosley/Black Marvel in Spider-Man, Sam Young in Batman Beyond, Lucious Sweet in The Simpsons, Earl Cooper in the Batman: The Animated Series episode "The Mechanic", Father in the Happily Ever After: Fairy Tales for Every Child episode "Beauty and the Beast"), (d. 2004).
 May 25: Ian McKellen, English actor (voice of Horatio Huntington in Animal Crackers, Toad in Flushed Away, Cecil Pritchfield in the Family Guy episode "Send In Stewie, Please", himself in The Simpsons episode "The Regina Monologues").
 May 28: Beth Howland, American actress (voice of Singer in the Batman Beyond episode "Out of the Past", Dr. Leventhal in the As Told by Ginger episode "And She Was Gone"), (d. 2015).

June
 June 13: Siegfried Fischbacher, German-American magician, entertainer and producer (Father of the Pride), (d. 2021).
 June 26: Stu Rosen, American voice director and actor (Hulk Hogan's Rock 'n' Wrestling, The Legend of Prince Valiant, Fraggle Rock: The Animated Series), (d. 2019).

July
 July 26: Bob Baker, English screenwriter (Wallace & Gromit), (d. 2021).
 July 30: Peter Bogdanovich, American director, writer, actor, producer, critic and film historian (voice of Psychologist in The Simpsons episode "Yokel Chords"), (d. 2022).

August
 August 16: Carole Shelley, English actress (voice of Amelia Gabble in The Aristocats, Lady Kluck in Robin Hood), (d. 2018).
 August 22: Valerie Harper, American actress (voice of various characters in The Simpsons, Townspeople in the Sorcerous Stabber Orphen episode "The Sword of Baltanders", Maryellen and Librarian in the As Told by Ginger episode "The Wedding Frame", IHOP Diner in the American Dad! episode "Cock of the Sleepwalk", additional voices in Generator Gawl), (d. 2019).
 August 30: John Peel, English disc jockey, radio presenter, record producer and journalist (voice of Announcer in the Space Ghost Coast to Coast episode "Explode"), (d. 2004).

September
 September 1: Lily Tomlin, American actress (voice of Ms. Frizzle in The Magic School Bus, Edith Ann in Edith Ann: A Few Pieces of the Puzzle, Edith Ann: Homeless Go Home and Edith Ann's Christmas (Just Say Noel), Mommo in The Ant Bully, Toki in Ponyo, May Parker in Spider-Man: Into the Spider-Verse, Tammy in The Simpsons episode "The Last of the Red Hat Mamas").
 September 5:
 Stephen J. Lawrence, American composer (Sesame Street, The Wubbulous World of Dr. Seuss), (d. 2021).
 George Lazenby, Australian actor (voice of King in Batman Beyond).
 September 13: Richard Kiel, American actor (voice of Vladimir in Tangled), (d. 2014).
 September 17: Shelby Flint, American singer-songwriter (Snoopy Come Home, The Rescuers), and actress (voice of Belle in The Stingiest Man in Town, Lilly Lorraine in Rudolph and Frosty's Christmas in July).

October
 October 2: Yoshisada Sakaguchi, Japanese voice actor (voice of Philip II of Macedon in Reign, Muijika in Mushishi, Hachiroh Tohbe in Jin-Roh: The Wolf Brigade, Tonpetty in JoJo's Bizarre Adventure: Phantom Blood), (d. 2020).
 October 27: John Cleese, English actor, comedian, (voice of Cat R. Waul in An American Tail: Fievel Goes West, King Harold in the Shrek franchise, Quincy Endicott/Adelaide in Over the Garden Wall, narrator in Winnie the Pooh and House of Mouse, King Gristle Sr. in Trolls, Bulldog in Planes), and screenwriter (The Croods).
 October 30: Danny Goldman, American actor and casting director (voice of Brainy Smurf in The Smurfs, Cartoon All-Stars to the Rescue and Robot Chicken), (d. 2020).

November
 November 10: Russell Means, American activist and actor (voice of Chief Powhatan in Pocahontas and Pocahontas II: Journey to a New World, Shaman and Chief Sentry in Turok: Son of Stone, Thomas in the Duckman episode "Role With It"), (d. 2012).
 November 18: Brenda Vaccaro, American actress (voice of Tilly in Nestor the Long-Eared Christmas Donkey, Scruple and Architect Smurf in The Smurfs, Didi in The Jetsons Meet the Flintstones, Ardeth in The Critic, Marge and Chi in Captain Planet and the Planeteers, Bunny Bravo and other various characters in Johnny Bravo, Mrs. Hirsch in Charlotte's Web 2: Wilbur's Great Adventure, Kameyo in Kubo and the Two Strings, Slim in the Darkwing Duck episode "You Sweat Your Life", Gilda in the Goof Troop episode "Date with Destiny", Strip Club Manager in the American Dad! episode "Stan Knows Best", Godmonster in the Summer Camp Island episode "Monster Visit").

December
 December 4: Robert Glass, American sound engineer (The Simpsons), (d. 1993).
 December 26: Ron Campbell, Australian film director, producer (Ron Campbell Films, Inc.) and animator (Hanna-Barbera, Disney Television Animation, Nickelodeon Animation Studio, The Beatles, Yellow Submarine, Sesame Street, Duckman), (d. 2021).

Specific date unknown
 Suzanne Baker, Australian film producer (Leisure).
 Nelson Shin, Korean animator (DePatie-Freleng Enterprises, Marvel Productions, Star Wars), director (The Transformers: The Movie, Toad Patrol) and producer (The Transformers, Spiral Zone, founder and president of AKOM).
 David Brown, American businessman (co-founder of Blue Sky Studios), (d. 2003).
 Sam Cornell, American animator (George of the Jungle, The Hugga Bunch, Jetsons: The Movie, directed the main titles for The Wuzzles and The New Woody Woodpecker Show), background artist (Shinbone Alley), storyboard artist (George of the Jungle, The Rugrats Movie), writer and director (The New 3 Stooges), (d. 2021).
 David Hamilton Grant, English pornographic producer and convicted criminal (Snow White and the Seven Perverts), (d. 1991).

Deaths

January
 January 20: Victor Bergdahl, Swedish animator and comics artist (Kapten Grogg), dies at age 60.

October
 October 10: Benjamin Rabier, French comics artist, illustrator, animator and advertising artist (Gédéon, Tintin-Lutin, designed La Vache Qui Rit), dies at age 74.

December
 December 30: Charles Mintz, American film producer (Winkler Pictures, Oswald the Lucky Rabbit), dies at age 50.

See also
List of anime by release date (1939–1945)

Notes

References

External links 
Animated works of the year, listed in the IMDb

1939 in animation